Kung Fu Master. or derivatives thereof, may refer to:

 Kung Fu Master (film), a 1988 French drama film directed by Agnès Varda
 The Kung Fu Master (TV series), a 1994 Hong Kong martial arts television series
 The Kung Fu Master, a 2020 Indian Malayalam-language martial arts film
 Kung Fu Master, a 2005 film directed and produced by Gordon Chan
 Kung-Fu Master (video game), a side-scrolling beat 'em up game
 The Kung-Fu Master Jackie Chan, a 1995 fighting arcade game developed and published by Kaneko

See also
 Kung Fu Cult Master, a 1993 Hong Kong wuxia film adapted from Louis Cha's novel The Heaven Sword and Dragon Saber